The Case of Prosecutor M (German: Der Fall des Staatsanwalts M...) is a 1928 German silent mystery film directed by Rudolf Meinert and Giulio Antamoro and starring Maria Jacobini, Jean Angelo and Gregori Chmara.  It was released in the United States in 1930 by Unusual Photoplays Inc. as The Strange Case of the District Attorney
with English intertitles by Don Bartlett and an added sound effects track.

The film's sets were designed by Robert A. Dietrich.

Cast
 Maria Jacobini as Wera Mirzewa  
 Jean Angelo as Mirzew, ihr Gatte  
 Gregori Chmara as Poljarin  
 Ida Wüst as Ivitzkaja  
 Elza Temary as Sinaida Koljawa  
 Natalya Rozenel as Julia  
 Warwick Ward as Shegin  
 Oreste Bilancia as Dr. Siegel  
 Gyula Szőreghy as Starobelski  
 Harry Frank as Plutanow 
 Felicitas Holz

References

Bibliography
 Alfred Krautz. International directory of cinematographers, set- and costume designers in film, Volume 4. Saur, 1984.

External links

1928 films
Films of the Weimar Republic
German silent feature films
Films directed by Rudolf Meinert
Films directed by Giulio Antamoro
1928 mystery films
German mystery films
German black-and-white films
Silent mystery films
1920s German films